Noah Henry Byington (September 26, 1809 – December 29, 1877) was an American physician and politician.

Byington was born in Bristol, Conn., September 26, 1809, and died in Southington, Conn., December 29, 1877, aged 68 years.

His medical studies were begun with his elder brother, Charles Byington, M. D., of Bristol, and continued in New Haven and Philadelphia. On receiving his degree from Yale Medical School in 1834, he began the practice of his profession in Wolcott, Conn., where he resided until 1849, when he removed to Southington, where he continued in active service until the attack of diphtheria which closed his life after a fortnight's illness. He had represented both Wolcott and Southington in the Connecticut State Legislature, and had taken special interest in all educational matters.

External links
 

1809 births
1877 deaths
People from Bristol, Connecticut
Physicians from Connecticut
Yale School of Medicine alumni
Members of the Connecticut General Assembly
19th-century American politicians
People from Southington, Connecticut